This list organizes and collects the names of notable people who are known for their birth, residency or other association with Canton, Ohio.

Arts and entertainment

 Jake Abel, actor
 James B. Allardice, Emmy Award-winning television writer
 Matt Bors, Pulitzer Prize-nominated political cartoonist and creator of Idiot Box web comic
 Brannon Braga, television producer, director and screenwriter
 Rowland Brown, director and screenwriter
 Frank De Vol, composer, arranger, actor
 Abastenia St. Leger Eberle, sculptor
 Randall Craig Fleischer, philharmonic conductor
 Peggy Ann Garner, actress
 Macy Gray, R&B singer
 Inhale Exhale, Christian metal band
 Joshua Jay, magician
 James Karales, major civil rights era photographer
 Kathryn Karipides, choreographer and principal dancer
 Karl King, composer and bandleader
 Mark Kozelek, musician
 Enoch Light, bandleader and violinist
 Lovedrug, indie band
Charles R. Macauley, Pulitzer Prize-winning cartoonist
 Marilyn Manson (born Brian Hugh Warner), rock singer of the band of the same name
 Eddie McClintock, actor
 Richard Miller, opera singer, voice teacher, professor at Oberlin Conservatory, author
 Cathy Nesbitt-Stein, dance instructor, owner of Candy Apples Dance Center, and star on Dance Moms television series
 The O'Jays, soul group; a street in northeast Canton is named The O'Jays Parkway
 Jack Paar, host of The Tonight Show; namesake of a street named in northeast Canton
 Jean Peters, actress; was married to Howard Hughes
 Relient K, Christian rock band
 Boz Scaggs, musician
 Jeff Shreve, sports announcer
 Blanche Thebom, opera singer
 Jeff Timmons, singer, 98 Degrees
 Nate Torrence, actor
 Steve Tracy, actor
 Trippie Redd, rapper
 Joe Vitale, musician, has played with Joe Walsh, The Eagles, Crosby, Stills & Nash, Michael Stanley Band and The Chylds
 Kelly Wearstler, interior designer; Playboy playmate
 Lee Wilkof, Broadway actor
 Nicole Wood, Playboy playmate
 Erin Wyatt, model and actress

Politics

 Frank T. Bow, jurist and politician
 Lafayette Caskey, Wisconsin state legislator and carpenter
 Leroy John Contie, Jr., judge
 Andrew W. Cordier, U.N. official
 Shelley Hughes, current member of the Alaska House of Representatives
 Frank Lavin, international trade official
 Susie Lee, U.S. Representative 
 Benjamin F. Leiter, mayor of Canton, member of the U.S. House of Representatives
 William A. Lynch, lawyer and politician
 Ida Saxton McKinley, 29th First Lady of the United States, wife of William McKinley
 William McKinley, 25th U.S. President; interred in Canton at the McKinley National Memorial
 Alan Page, member of the Pro Football Hall of Fame and College Football Hall of Fame; current Associate Justice of the Minnesota Supreme Court
 John A. Scali, United States Ambassador, United Nations
 Kirk Schuring, Republican, Ohio House of Representatives

Sports

 Todd Blackledge, football player, Kansas City Chiefs, Pittsburgh Steelers; college football commentator
 Dick Cunningham, NBA player for the Milwaukee Bucks and Houston Rockets, 1971 NBA champion
 Dan Dierdorf, football player, television commentator, College and Pro Football Hall of Famer
 Mike Doss, football player
 Wayne Fontes, football player and coach, Detroit Lions
 Dustin Fox, football player, Buffalo Bills; nephew of Tim Fox
 Tim Fox, football player, New England Patriots, San Diego Chargers, Los Angeles Rams; uncle of Dustin Fox
 Gary Grant, basketball player, L.A. Clippers, New York Knicks, Miami Heat, Portland Trail Blazers
 John Grimsley, football player, University of Kentucky, Houston Oilers, Miami Dolphins
 Ronnie Harris, boxer, gold medalist, lightweight, 1968 Summer Olympics
 Brian Hartline, wide receiver for the Cleveland Browns; brother of Mike Hartline
 Mike Hartline, former quarterback for the Kentucky Wildcats football team, former member of New England Patriots; brother of Brian Hartline
 Michael Hawkins, basketball player
 Ralph Hay, National Football League founding contributor
 Dirk Hayhurst, baseball player
 Dick Himes, football player, Green Bay Packers
 Phil Hubbard, basketball player and coach, Olympic gold medalist
 Tim Huffman, football player, Green Bay Packers
 Chuck Hutchison, football player
 Kosta Koufos, basketball player, Utah Jazz, Denver Nuggets and Greece national team; former Ohio State Buckeyes player
 Kirk Lowdermilk, football player
 Jamar Martin, football player
 CJ McCollum, basketball player, Portland Trail Blazers
 Josh McDaniels, head coach of the Las Vegas Raiders
 Keith McLeod, basketball player
 Raymar Morgan, professional basketball player for Barak Netanya in Israel
 Marion Motley, football player
 Thurman Munson, baseball player, 1976 American League Most Valuable Player, 7-time All-Star
 Mark Murphy, football player, Green Bay Packers
 Don Nehlen, football coach, College Football Hall of Fame
 Alan Page, football player, College and Pro Football Hall of Famer
 Bob Pickard, football player
 Kenny Peterson, football player
 John Pont, college football coach
 Ed Poole, baseball player
Renee Powell, former LPGA Golfer
 Ed Rate,  football player
 Nick Roman, football player
 Ernie Roth, professional wrestling manager known as Abdullah Farouk and The Grand Wizard of Wrestling
 George Saimes, football player 1963–1972, Buffalo Bills, Denver Broncos, member of American Football League All-Time Team (first team, defense)
 Eric Snow, basketball player; brother of Percy Snow
 Percy Snow, football player, Kansas City Chiefs; brother of Eric Snow
 Larry Snyder, track and field athlete, Ohio State coach for Jesse Owens
 Chris Spielman, football player, College Football Hall of Fame
 Rick Spielman, former general manager of the Minnesota Vikings; brother of Chris Spielman
 LeRoy Sprankle, high school multi-sport coach, author, general manager of the Canton Independents
 Charley Stanceu, baseball player New York Yankees, Philadelphia Phillies
 Nick Weatherspoon, Illinois and professional basketball player
 Don Willis, pool player
 Dave Wottle, gold medalist in the 800 meter run at the 1972 Summer Olympics

Other 

 Mark Aldenderfer, archaeologist and anthropologist
 Mother Angelica, Roman Catholic nun and foundress of the Eternal Word Television Network
 Christine Craft, broadcast journalist
 Bobby Lee Cutts, police officer convicted in the murder of Jessie Davis
 Thomas Dillon, serial killer
 Helias Doundoulakis, Greek-American soldier, OSS spy, and designer of the Arecibo Antenna, once the world's largest radio telescope
 Ted Henry, broadcast journalist
 James Huberty, mass murderer
 Reuben Klamer, inventor of The Game of Life and various other toys; inducted into the Toy Industry Hall of Fame; honored by the Smithsonian Institution
 Don Mellett, newspaper editor
 Marshall Rosenberg, creator of Nonviolent Communication
 Bob Shaheen, retired American businessman
 Rhoda Wise, stigmatist named a Servant of God by the Roman Catholic Church

References

Canton
Canton